Loss Time Life is a 2019 South Korean television series starring Song Yuvin and Kwon Mina. It is a remake of the 2008 Japanese drama of the same name which aired on Fuji TV with Juri Ueno and Ryō Tamura as lead actors. The series aired on February 13 and 14, 2019, at 23:00 (KST) time slot of MBN and UMAX.

Synopsis
So-jin was Yoo-geon's childhood friend and first love. They meet again as she becomes one of his teachers in high school.  After he suddenly dies, Yoo-geon is given a second chance in the form of thirty hours during which he finds the meaning of love.

Cast

Main
 Song Yuvin as Kim Yoo-geon
A high school student who is a member of the judo team.
 Kwon Mina as So-jin
A hardworking teacher who has no interest in dating.

Supporting
 Kim Jin-woo as Gu Jin-seong
A physical education teacher at Yoo-geon's school.
 Jang Dong-joo as Ju Dong-ha
A member of the judo team and Yoo-geon's rival.
 Oh Jung-yeon as Gae Seu-teo
 Kim Won-hyo as Hae Sol-ja
 Park Sun-jae
 Choi Min
 Lee Gyu-sung
 Kim Jae-won
 Lee Sang-eun
 Hong Hyun-ho
 Um Hyo-sup as Head Referee

Production
The series was entirely pre-produced.

Original soundtrack

Ratings
In this table,  represent the lowest ratings and  represent the highest ratings.

References

External links
 Official website (UMAX) 
 

Maeil Broadcasting Network television dramas
Korean-language television shows
2019 South Korean television series debuts
2019 South Korean television series endings
South Korean melodrama television series
South Korean fantasy television series
South Korean pre-produced television series